Lukovek is a village in the Municipality of Trebnje in eastern Slovenia. The area is part of the historical region of Lower Carniola. The municipality is now included in the Southeast Slovenia Statistical Region.

The local church is dedicated to Saint George and belongs to the  Parish of Trebnje. It was first mentioned in written documents dating to 1498.

References

External links
Lukovek at Geopedia

Populated places in the Municipality of Trebnje